Shao Hua (30 October 1938 – 24 June 2008), formerly known as Zhang Shaohua, was a Chinese photographer and a major general in the People's Liberation Army. She was the wife of Mao Anqing, the second son of Mao Zedong.

Biography
She was born as Chen Anyun in October 1938 in Yan'an, Shaanxi, the headquarters of Mao Zedong's Communist Party following the Long March. Her father was Chen Zhenhua, who was from Shimin, Hunan.  Her mother was Zhang Wenqiu, who was from Jingshan County, Hubei.

Shao began working as a photographer in the 1950s using a camera which had been brought to her from the Soviet Union by Mao Zedong's eldest son, Mao Anying. She traveled extensively throughout China following the Chinese Civil War. The subjects of her photographs were often related to the government of the Communist movement, including factories and other factors of production, army units, schools, and poor rural Chinese villages. She became the head of the China Photographers Association (CPA) in 2002 and served in that position until her death in 2008.

Shao was a major general in the People's Liberation Army. She served as the director of the military encyclopedia department of the PLA Academy of Military Sciences. Shao was a member of the National Committee of the Chinese People's Political Consultative Conference (CPPCC) from 1988 to 2002, when she began displaying her photographs publicly.

Shao married Mao Anqing, Mao Zedong's second son and a Russian linguist, in September 1960. The couple had one son, Mao Xinyu. Her husband had no active role in the Chinese government. Mao Anqing died on 23 March 2007, at the age of 84. Her son Mao Xinyu and his wife, Liu Bin, have one son Mao Dongdong who was born in 2003, the only great-grandson of Mao Zedong.

Shao Hua died in Beijing due to breast cancer on 24 June 2008, at the age of 69.

References 

1938 births
2008 deaths
Mao Zedong family
Chinese photographers
Chinese women photographers
Members of the 7th Chinese People's Political Consultative Conference
Members of the 8th Chinese People's Political Consultative Conference
Members of the 9th Chinese People's Political Consultative Conference
Members of the 10th Chinese People's Political Consultative Conference
People's Liberation Army generals from Shaanxi
Politicians from Yan'an
Artists from Shaanxi
Chinese Communist Party politicians from Shaanxi
People's Republic of China politicians from Shaanxi
Peking University alumni
Deaths from breast cancer
Deaths from cancer in the People's Republic of China